Pakistan was the host nation for the 4th South Asian Games held in its capital, Islamabad between 20 and 27 October 1989. The country participated in all of the 10 sports: athletics, boxing, kabbadi, squash, swimming, table tennis, volleyball, weightlifting and wrestling. Its medal tally of 97 placed it second amongst the seven nations. Weightlifting was again its most successful event, where it won 28 medals (10 gold,  14 silver, 4 bronze) with athletics a close second with 27 medals (11 gold, 8 silver, 8 bronze).

Notable Athletes 

 Athletics: Jamshed Awan, Fatima Daud, Ibrahim Latif
 Boxing: TJ Jilani, Sultan Nasir, Abdul Qayum Haider
 Football:
 Kabbadi: Saeen Ishfaaq, Qutubudin Awan, Nasir Ali rizwi
 Squash: Jansher Khan, Jehangir Khan
 Swimming: Furqaan Ahmaed
 Table Tennis: Samina Jaffery, Quratul-ain
 Volleyball:
 Weightlifting: Shujja Hashmi, Ali Azam Pasha
 Wrestling: Shahid Pervaiz Butt

References

1989 South Asian Games
1989 in Pakistani sport
Pakistan at the South Asian Games